A Watchdog's Tale (Traditional Chinese: 老友狗狗, literally Friends of Dogs), is a 2010 TVB modern drama series. It stars Linda Chung and Steven Ma as the main leads, with Kent Cheng, Natalie Tong, Raymond Wong and Maggie Shiu as the major supporting cast.

Synopsis
Lai Chun Sing (Kent Cheng) has been in the police force for 30 years. During one investigation, his assistant police dog sacrificed its life to save him. Struck by the death, Sing decided to join the Police Dog Unit. In 25 years, he advanced from a dog caretaker to an instructor and he now plans to use his retirement money to open a dog care center, allowing dog owners to bring their dogs for training and play.

Sing's wife died a long time ago, but left him with an obedient daughter, Lai Sin Yue (Linda Chung). Yue follows after her father and loves animals as if they were human. This eventually leads Yue to become a veterinarian. She later decides to help her dad and moves to the countryside to help with his dog care center. Her determination is driven by the fact that she wants to make sure all animals are treated lovingly.

In the countryside, they soon meet the rowdy bunch that lives there. Chow Yung Kung (Steven Ma) is the renovator who is in charge of preparing the dog care center. Yue and Kung initially start off on the wrong foot, but the two eventually start developing feelings for each other as they spend more time together. They start to fall in love with each other, but Sing refuses to accept Kung as his daughter's boyfriend, saying that Kung has no education and no stable job. To make things more complicated, Kung's ex-girlfriend (Queenie Chu) reappears with a vengeance.

The two side stories involve Chiang Tin-Ngo (Maggie Shiu), her brother Tin-Hung (Joseph Lee), Chou Ka-Man (Natalie Tong), and Ho Tin-Yau (Raymond Wong Ho-yin). Tin-Hung has always been looked down upon by his father and sister as a failure. He wants to start his own business, but his father will not loan him the money, believing all of his son's ideas are bound to end up a disaster. His sister refuses to help him plead their father, so Tin-Hung resorts to kidnapping Tin-Ngo and demanding their father for a large sum of money.

Tin-Ngo then devotes herself to finding the kidnapper, believing it is someone in the nearby countryside. She monitors all of the villagers closely, looking for something suspicious. She even decides to move in to study them closer. Tin-Hung, scared that his sister might figure out the kidnapper was him, moves himself to the countryside too, attempting to prevent Tin-Ngo from getting any serious evidence. While she is there, Tin-Ngo starts to develop feelings for Sing, but she is rejected and runs away.

Meanwhile, Tin-Yau is a striving police officer that wants to do the best he can at his job. Ka-Man has a crush on him, but Tin-Yau refuses to admit his feelings for her. However, the two eventually become a couple. Ka-Man's dad is a drug dealer and is scared that with Tin-Yau always around the house, he'll stumble upon his hidden drugs. Ka-Man's dad tells them to break up, but Ka-Man refuses. Unknown to her, Ka-Man has been hauling around a bowling ball stuffed with crystal meth that she thinks is a present from her dad...

Will Sing learn to accept Kung and Yue? Will Yue and Kung overcome tides of difficulty? Will Tin-Ngo find out who kidnapped her? And will Ka-Man find her birth mother, as well as reconcile with her dad and Tin-Yau?

Cast

Chow family

Lai family

Cheung Sing Village

Chiang family

Other cast

Awards and nominations
TVB Anniversary Awards (2010)
 Won: Most Improved Male Artiste (Raymond Wong Ho-yin)
 Won: Most Improved Female Artiste (Natalie Tong)
 Nominated: Best Drama
 Nominated: Best Supporting Actress (Maggie Siu)
 Nominated: My Favourite Male Character (Steven Ma) - Top 5
Next TV Awards (2010)
 Won: Top 10 TV series (No.8)
 Won: Top 10 TV artists (Linda Chung - No.6)

Viewership ratings

References

External links
TVB.com A Watchdog's Tale - Official Website 

TVB dramas
2009 Hong Kong television series debuts
2010 Hong Kong television series endings
Police dogs in fiction
Television shows about dogs